KRDD (AM 1320) was a radio station licensed to Roswell, New Mexico. The station was last owned by Carlos Espinoza.

The Federal Communications Commission cancelled KRDD's license on October 4, 2021, due to the station failing to file an application to renew its license.

References

External links
FCC History Cards for KRDD (covering 1961-1981)
FCC Station Search Details: DKRDD (Facility ID: 68131)
KRDD Facebook

RDD
Radio stations established in 1963
1963 establishments in New Mexico
Radio stations disestablished in 2021
2021 disestablishments in New Mexico
Defunct radio stations in the United States
RDD